Count Xavier Branicki (in Polish: ,), born 26 October 1816 in Warsaw, Poland, died 20 November 1879 in Assiut, Khedivate of Egypt, was a Polish nobleman, political exile and landowner who took French nationality.  He became a political writer, financier, art collector and philanthropist. He was the owner and restorer of the Château de Montrésor and estate in France. He was descended from a powerful magnate family with immense land holdings in the Duchy of Lithuania and in Ukraine, partly as a result, it is said, of a family connection with Catherine the Great. He was a member of the close circle of Napoleon III. He was a co-founder of the Crédit Foncier de France, a bank that continues to this day.

Publications
Branicki was the author of the following works:
 .
 .
 .
 .

See also
 List of Poles
 Louis Wolowski

References

External links 
 Chateau de Montresor

1816 births
1879 deaths
Xavier
Nobility from Warsaw
Polish emigrants to France
Polish art collectors
Polish bibliophiles
Polish book and manuscript collectors
Polish antiquarians
Polish philanthropists
19th-century Polish businesspeople
19th-century French businesspeople
French political writers
French bankers
Chevaliers of the Légion d'honneur
19th-century Polish landowners